Aga Khan School may refer to the following (listed in order by country):

Aga Khan Education Services, with more than 200 schools
Aga Khan Academies
Aga Khan School, Dhaka, Bangladesh
Aga Khan Academy, Hyderabad, India
Aga Khan Academy, Nairobi, Kenya
Aga Khan Junior Academy, Nairobi, Kenya
Aga Khan School, Osh, Kyrgyzstan
Aga Khan Higher Secondary School, Gilgit, Pakistan
Aga Khan Lycée, Khorog, Tajikistan

See also

Aga Khan Development Network

Aga Khan schools
Schools